The Cambodian laughingthrush (Garrulax ferrarius) is a species of bird in the family Leiothrichidae.  It used to be considered conspecific with the white-necked laughingthrush, G. strepitans.  It is found in southwestern Cambodia.  Its natural habitats are subtropical or tropical moist lowland forests and subtropical or tropical moist montane forests.

References

Cambodian laughingthrush
Birds of Cambodia
Cambodian laughingthrush
Cambodian laughingthrush